Weakest Link is a game show franchise, which has appeared in the following versions:

Television
 Weakest Link (Australia)
 Weakest Link (Finland)
 Weakest Link (Germany)
 Weakest Link (Hong Kong)
 Weakest Link (Ireland)
 Weakest Link (New Zealand)
 Weakest Link (Poland)
 Weakest Link (Russia)
 Weakest Link (United Kingdom), the original UK series
 Weakest Link (American game show), the U.S. version produced by NBC and first syndicated version

Other uses
 The Weakest Link (video game), a 2001 video game based on the TV show